Morten Wedendahl (born 29 January 1961 in Virum) is a Danish composer.

See also
List of Danish composers
Music of Denmark

References

External links
http://www.denstoredanske.dk/Gyldendals_Teaterleksikon/Teater_og_revykapelmestre/Morten_Wedendahl 

1961 births
Living people
Danish composers
Male composers
People from Lyngby-Taarbæk Municipality